The Alaska Native Tribal Health Consortium Land Transfer Act is a bill that would transfer some land in Alaska from the federal government to the Alaska Native Tribal Health Consortium, a non-profit health organization.  The land will be used to build a patient housing facility so that the organization can treat people who travel there from distant rural areas.   The bill passed in the United States House of Representatives during the 113th United States Congress. The bill was signed into law.

Provisions of the bill
This summary is based largely on the summary provided by the Congressional Research Service, a public domain source.

The Alaska Native Tribal Health Consortium Land Transfer Act would direct the Secretary of Health and Human Services (HHS) to convey to the Alaska Native Tribal Health Consortium a specified property in Anchorage, Alaska, for use in connection with health and related programs.

Procedural history

House
The Alaska Native Tribal Health Consortium Land Transfer Act was introduced in the House on February 12, 2013 by Rep. Don Young (R, AK-0).  It was referred to the United States House Committee on Natural Resources, the United States House Committee on Energy and Commerce, the United States House Energy Subcommittee on Health, and the United States House Natural Resources Subcommittee on Indian and Alaska Native Affairs.  It was reported (Amended) by the Committee on Natural Resources alongside House Report 113-248, Part I on October 22, 2013.  On October 25, 2013, House Majority Leader Eric Cantor announced that H.R. 623 would be on the House schedule for the week of October 28, 2013. The bill was considered under the suspension of the rules. On October 29, 2013, the House voted to passed the bill by a voice vote.

See also
List of bills in the 113th United States Congress

Notes/References

External links

Library of Congress - Thomas H.R. 623
beta.congress.gov H.R. 623
GovTrack.us H.R. 623
OpenCongress.org H.R. 623
WashingtonWatch.com H.R. 623
House Republican Conference's legislative digest on H.R. 623

Acts of the 113th United States Congress